Édouard-Jean Gilbert (1888–1954) was a French mycologist.

He wrote a thesis on the genus Amanita in 1919, and subsequently a monograph on them in 1941.

References

1888 births
1954 deaths
Botanists with author abbreviations
French mycologists